Hosh may refer to several places:

Hosh Bannaga, a town in Sudan
Hosh Essa, a city in Egypt
Hosh, Perth and Kinross, a place in Perth and Kinross, Scotland
Hush, Lorestan, a village in Iran

It may also refer to:
Hosh (architecture)

See also 
 HOSH, German DJ
 Maarat Umm Hawsh